Cyrtodactylus arunachalensis is a species of gecko that is endemic to Arunachal Pradesh in India.

References

Cyrtodactylus
Reptiles described in 2021